Hushang Ansary (born 1927) is an Iranian-American former diplomat, businessman, and philanthropist. He served for eighteen years in the Iranian government prior to the Iranian Revolution including as Minister of Economic Affairs and Finance and Iran's Ambassador to the United States from 1967 to 1969. He has been chairman or director of companies both in Iran and in the United States.

Biography
Born in 1927 in Ahvaz, in Iran's Khuzestan Province, Ansary first worked as a newspaper and magazine photographer in Ahvaz, Tehran, and England before moving to Japan in 1954. There he met Abbas Aram, Iran's ambassador to Japan, who soon brought him to the attention of Shah Mohammad Reza Pahlavi. The Shah asked Ansary to return to Iran and appointed him to several government positions starting in 1961, including undersecretary of commerce, ambassador to many African nations and to Pakistan, and minister of information.

In 1964, he married Maryam Panahi, a friend of ambassador Abbas Aram who had many high-ranking acquaintances in the governments of the United States and Iran. He served as ambassador to the United States until July 1969. Then he was named as the minister of economic affairs and finance. His accomplishments during this time included assisting the Shah in lending millions of dollars in aid and grants to other countries and the signing of an agreement with U.S. State Secretary Henry Kissinger to build eight nuclear power plants in Iran.

By the 1970s, the CIA considered Ansary to be one of the seventeen members of "the Shah's Inner Circle" and he was one of the Shah's top two choices to succeed Amir Abbas Hoveyda as Prime Minister. Ultimately, this appointment went to Jamshid Amouzegar, and Ansary became the leader of the Constructionist wing of the Rastakhiz party, which opposed Amouzegar's Progressive wing. Some of Ansary's supporters have seen Amouzegar's appointment as a poor decision in hindsight. Even his now ex-wife Maryam Panahi, to whom his marriage "came to a bitter end" according to historian Abbas Milani, said "not appointing Hushang was one of the shah's two biggest mistakes, leading to the revolution." In November 1977, Ansary became the director of the National Iranian Oil Company, but resigned one year later and moved to the United States, citing health problems.

Business and philanthropy
During his time in the Iranian government, Ansary also maintained a successful career in business. He was the director of an unstable company called Fakhre Iran, which he made profitable and sold to the government. Ansary arrived in the U.S. a very wealthy man and became a U.S. citizen in 1986. After settling in the United States, Ansary started the Parman Group, a holding company for leisure industries, textiles, international trade, and real estate, which included IRI International - a company that makes oilfield equipment. IRI International was sold to National Oilwell Varco in 2005. Ansary was the chairman of Stewart & Stevenson LLC until the company was purchased by Kirby Corp in September 2018.

In recent years Ansari and Parman have come under scrutiny of the Central Bank of Curaçao and Sint Maarten (CBCS) with regard to financial misappropriations regarding an insurance company operating in the Dutch Caribbean islands of Aruba, Curaçao and Sint Maarten. The CBCS has stated that under shareholder Parman International B.V., in which Ansary is a majority shareholder, ENNIA Caribe Holding and ENNIA Caribe Investments had appropriated 1,5 billion Antillean guilders (approximately $838 million) from ENNIA insurance companies. These insurance companies operate on the islands of Curaçao and Sint Maarten and therefore fall under the supervision of the CBCS. According to the CBCS, the appropriation took place by having the insurance companies invest in shares in another Parman subsidiary, Stewart & Stevenson Inc. When these shares were sold in 2017, although the insurance companies had held 74% of the shares and should have received $558.7 million, they only received $282.2 million and thus lost approximately $273 million. In another transaction, land at Mullet Bay (sint Maarten) was put in the books of the insurance company for 771 million guilders (just under $431 million) although according to Cushman & Wakefield, one of the largest appraisers in the world, the value is only 89 million guilders ($49 million). In August 2018, after negotiations between CBCS and ENNIA and major shareholder Husang Ansary collapsed, Ansary gave instructions to withdraw $100 million in policyholders money from ENNIA. After CBCS placed ENNIA under an emergency measure, the $100 million was returned to ENNIA. The CBCS notes, however, that $50 million came from a private account of Ansary. On January 29, 2019, a United States Bankruptcy Court declared CBCS is entitled to the accounts since based on the emergency measure, CBCS, and not Parman, is effectively managing ENNIA. The accounts had been frozen because Parman and its major shareholder Ansary did not want to confirm that the CBCS is entitled to the accounts. According to the CBCS, the procedures of Parman and Ansary delay the restructuring process of ENNIA, which increases the risk of its policy holders.

Ansary is a devoted Republican, a former friend and business partner of Henry Kissinger, Alexander Haig, and James Baker, served on the National Finance Committee of the Bush-Cheney 2004 Presidential Campaign and is a trustee of the George W. Bush Presidential Library. In 2015, Ansary and his wife donated $2 million to a Super PAC supporting the presidential candidacy of Jeb Bush.  He donated $2 million to Donald Trump's inauguration.

He was involved in the creation of several medical and educational institutions, such as the University of St. Martin and the James Baker Institute. In February 2014, Ansary supported the A Thousand Years of the Persian Book Exhibition at the Library of Congress.

Ansary and his wife Shahla are based in Houston, Texas. He has two children, Nina and Nader, and is the brother of Cyrus A. Ansary.

Awards and honors
 Ansary is a recipient of the Ellis Island Medal of Honor (2003) and the Woodrow Wilson Award.
 Weill Cornell Medical College of Cornell University established the Ansary Center for Stem Cell Therapeutics in 2004 in honor of a grant from Ansary and his wife Shahla.
 The American Academy of Diplomacy's Ansary Outreach Program was a two-year series of discussions, lectures, and seminars about U.S. foreign policy which began in 2004.
 The Ansary Gallery of American History at the George Bush Presidential Library was named in his honor in 2004.
 James A. Baker III Prize for Excellence in Leadership (2013)

Notes

External links

1927 births
Finance ministers of Iran
20th-century Iranian businesspeople
Living people
Rastakhiz Party politicians
Ambassadors of Iran to the United States
Ambassadors of Iran to Pakistan
Iranian emigrants to the United States
People from Ahvaz
Politicians from Houston
American philanthropists
Texas Republicans
Exiles of the Iranian Revolution in the United States
National Iranian Oil Company people